Ireland-Gardiner Farm is a historic home and farm complex located at Greenlawn in Suffolk County, New York. The original section of the main dwelling was built about 1750. It is a -story, shingled dwelling with a saltbox profile and a rear shed-roof addition. It has a central chimney and deep overhanging eaves. Also on the property are a barn, a corncrib, a shed, and a cottage.

It was added to the National Register of Historic Places in 1985.

References

Houses on the National Register of Historic Places in New York (state)
Houses completed in 1750
Houses in Suffolk County, New York
National Register of Historic Places in Suffolk County, New York